David Meckler (born July 9, 1987) is an American former professional ice hockey player. He last played for EHC Red Bull München in the Deutsche Eishockey Liga (DEL). He was selected by the Los Angeles Kings in the 5th round (134th overall) of the 2006 NHL Entry Draft.

Early life
Meckler, who is Jewish, was born in Highland Park, Illinois. He attended Waterloo High School and Yale University.

Playing career
On March 5, 2006, Meckler scored the winning goal to end the 2nd longest game in NCAA hockey history. Yale University defeated Union College, 3–2, in the ECAC Hockey League first-round playoff game after 81:35 of overtime. David Meckler scored the winning goal with Yale shorthanded.

Upon completion of his junior career with the London Knights of the Ontario Hockey League, Meckler signed a three-year entry level contract with the Los Angeles Kings to begin in the 2007–08 season. He was assigned to and became a fixture of American Hockey League affiliate, the Manchester Monarchs. After three years with the Monarchs, Meckler was re-signed by the Kings to a one-year contract on July 16, 2011.

After six seasons within the Kings organization with the Manchester Monarchs, featuring in 414 AHL contests yet unable to make his NHL debut, Meckler left as a free agent to forge a European career and signed a contract with Austrian club, EC Red Bull Salzburg on September 3, 2013.

After one year in the EC Red Bull Salzburg Organization, Meckler left Salzburg to sign a contract with sponsor affiliate, EHC Red Bull München of the Deutsche Eishockey Liga on November 17, 2014.

Meckler initially signed a one-year contract extension to remain in Munich, however on May 29, 2015, advised the club he would terminate the contract due to an enforced time-out from professional hockey due to a spinal injury.

Career statistics

See also
List of select Jewish ice hockey players

References

External links

1987 births
Living people
People from Highland Park, Illinois
American men's ice hockey left wingers
London Knights players
Los Angeles Kings draft picks
Manchester Monarchs (AHL) players
EHC München players
Jewish ice hockey players
Jewish American sportspeople
Ice hockey players from Illinois
EC Red Bull Salzburg players
Yale Bulldogs men's ice hockey players
Waterloo Black Hawks players